Rangs Group is one of the largest Bangladeshi industrial conglomerates. The industries under this conglomerate include automobile, electronics, real estate, shipping, pharmaceuticals etc. A Rouf Chowdhury is the chairperson of Rangs Group and Bank Asia Limited.

It is the official dealer of Mahindra, Mercedes-Benz, Mitsubishi, Morris Garages, Sony, Toshiba etc. in Bangladesh. Abdur Rouf Chowdhury is the present chairman of the group. The company also owns RanksTel.

History 
Ranks Agro Biotech was established by the group in 2000. Rangs Pharmaceuticals Limited was established in 2003. Ranks Real Estate Limited was established in 2008 and marked the entry of the group in real estate. Zest Polymer Limited was established in 2009 to manufacture polymer and plastic bottles for the pharmaceutical industry. Akhter Hussain, founder of Rangs Group, died on 12 February 2022.

Subsidiaries 

 Bank Asia Limited
 Reliance Insurance Limited
 Dolonchapa Express Limited
 Sea Resource Limited
 Zhen Natural Limited
 Shield Security Service Limited
 Rangs Motors Limited
 Ranks Commercial Vehicle Limited
 Ranks Motors Workshop Limited
 ZRC Engineering And Automobiles Limited
 Metro Foils Limited
 Rangs Pharmaceuticals Limited
 Zest Polymer Limited
 Ranks Construction Limited
 Ranks Agro Biotech Limited
 Ranks Powertech Limited
 Ranks Real Estate Limited
 Ranks Interiors Limited
 Ranks Food And Beverage Limited

References

External links
 Rangs Group's corporate

Real estate companies of Bangladesh
1979 establishments in Bangladesh
Companies based in Dhaka
Conglomerate companies of Bangladesh